Poliopastea clavipes is a moth in the subfamily Arctiinae. It was described by Jean Baptiste Boisduval in 1870. It is found from Texas, Mexico, Guatemala and Costa Rica to Venezuela.

References

Moths described in 1870
Euchromiina